Peifer is a surname. Notable people with the surname include:

Mark Peifer, American biologist
Michael Peifer (born 1968), American politician
Nicolas Peifer (born 1990), French wheelchair tennis player

See also
Peiffer